Parliamentary elections were held in Hungary on 7 April 2002, with a second round of voting in 131 of the 176 single member constituencies on 21 April. Although Fidesz remained the largest party in the National Assembly despite receiving fewer votes than the Hungarian Socialist Party, the Socialist Party was able to form a coalition government with the Alliance of Free Democrats.

Results

Notes

References

External links
National Electoral Office

Hungary
Elections in Hungary
Parliamentary
Hungary